Nidd is a village in Yorkshire, England. 

Nidd may also refer to:
 River Nidd, a tributary of the River Ouse
 Níð, an Old German term referring to a loss of honour
 Mornington Crescent (game) uses Nidd as a place of punishment and purgatory if a poor move is made
 Noninsulin-dependent diabetes (NIDD) – Type 2 diabetes
 , British freight ship, early 20th century 
 Fred Nidd (1869–1956), English footballer
 Niddesa, a Buddhist scripture

See also
 Nid (disambiguation)